Social value may refer to:
Social dimensions of value (ethics)
The UK's Public Services (Social Value) Act 2012